Guianodendron praeclarum is a South American legume endemic to the Guiana Shield. It is the only member of the genus Guianodendron. It has been segregated from Acosmium based on its unique combination of vegetative and floral traits, and it is related to Diplotropis. It is the only member of the genus Guianodendron.

References

External links
 Grupo de Pesquisas Sistemática e Morfologia de Angiospermas de Roraima—Universidade Federal de Roraima, Boa Vista, Roraima, Brazil.

Leptolobieae
Monotypic Fabaceae genera